The Genesee Area Conference (GAC) is a high school athletic conference in Genesee County, Michigan. It was original called the Genesee Eight Athletic Conference.  Since 2002, the GAC operates with two divisions:  Blue and Red.
In 2019, all members of the red division left to join the Flint Metro League conference, leaving the GAC with only four teams.

History
The Genesee Eight Athletic Conference began in 1978 with three high schools from the Genesee County B League and five from the Mid-Eastern Eight Conference.  Beginning in 1999, the Conference renamed itself to Genesee Area Conference with the addition of Genesee High School bring up the number of High Schools to ten. The Genesee Wolves also took the Football championship that year.  With the 2002 football season, the GAC split the Conference into two divisions (Blue and Red) of six high schools  with the addition of Mt. Morris and Lakeville High Schools. In recent years, however, it has lost a large number of members, as in 2018, six of its members broke off from the conference to form the Mid-Michigan Activities Conference, and three of its members left to join the Flint Metro League. 2019 saw it gain a member in Flint Southwestern, but also lose a member in Bentley.

Member schools

Current members

Current Divisions

Former members

Football
This conference championship list goes through the 2018 season. Morrice and Webberville complete in the Central Michigan 8-Man Football Conference.

References

Michigan high school sports conferences